

Nokomis 3 is a blend of chemicals created by scientists in 1971, specifically formulated to increase dispersion of oil spilled in bodies of water.

The synergetic formulation of chemicals is water-based and non-flammable. This product has been used by the United States Navy, State of California Fish and Game and the United States Environmental Protection Agency (EPA). Marlin Supply Inc. is the main distributor of this product with laboratories in San Francisco, Texas, Florida and Mexico. Nokomis 3 has been shown in studies to increase the rate of biodegradation of petroleum hydrocarbons with one study observing the degradation rate increased to 5.07 ± 0.37 mg L−1 day−1 from 2.39 ± 0.22 mg L−1 day−1.

When the product is released out of an airplane or aerial applied, it has an increased viscosity, causing a better chance for it to reach the ground.

This product is designed specifically to clean up No. 2 Oil Fuel in bodies of water. Nokomis 3 is a base on the pH scale and is completely water soluble.

Nokomis 3-AA 

This specific product of Nokomis 3 is a water based colloid. Nokomis 3-AA can be applied through spray nozzles on workboats or ships and for best use the propeller of the boats can be helpful with mixing the product into the water for the most effect.

Nokomis 3-F4 

The second design of Nokomis 3 is the Nokomis 3-F4. It is made with a higher viscosity, increasing the chance that the full product with reach the water's surface.  It is not always applied by plane but can also be sprayed through nozzles to the top of the water's surface. Depending on the situation and the size of the oil spill, it can be applied either diluted or at full strength.

See also 
Oil spill
Crude oil
Bioremediation
Microorganisms
Biological agent

References

External links
Nokomis 3
Nokomis 3-F4 EPA Technical Product Bulletin

Oil spill remediation technologies
Ocean pollution